Secretory carrier-associated membrane protein 5 is a protein that in humans is encoded by the SCAMP5 gene.

References

Further reading